Orin Doughty Haugen (August 18, 1907 – February 22, 1945) was a colonel in the United States Army and commanding officer of the 511th Parachute Infantry Regiment during World War II.

Career
Born in Wyndmere, North Dakota,  Haugen graduated from the United States Military Academy in 1930. Commissioned into the Infantry Branch, Haugen had a variety of postings and training.

In 1940 he was serving in the 32nd Infantry at Fort Ord, California when he volunteered for the then new United States Parachute Troops.  Captain Haugen become commander of "A" Company of the 501st Parachute Infantry Battalion.  He later became executive officer of the 505th Parachute Infantry Regiment then became the first regimental commander of the 511th Parachute Infantry.

Orin Haugen died en route to a hospital on New Guinea from wounds sustained during the Battle of Manila, one day before his regiment would rescue POWs under Japanese military control at Los Baños.

See also
Raid at Los Baños
JGSDF Camp Hachinohe

References

Other sources
Flanagan, Edward M. (1986) The Los Baños Raid: The 11th Airborne Jumps at Dawn  (Presidio Books)  
Flanagan, Edward M (1988) The Angels – A History of the 11th Airborne Division 1943–1946   (The Battery Press) 
Hagerman, Bart (1990) U.S.A. Airborne: 50th Anniversary, 1940-1990 (Turner Publishing Company)  
Henderson, Bruce (2015) Rescue at Los Baños: The Most Daring Prison Camp Raid of World War II (William Morrow)

External links
Background on the 511's Regimental Commander Orin Haugen
An Orin D. Haugen Page by Rebecca Webb, Oct. 23, 2002

1907 births
1945 deaths
Military personnel from North Dakota
People from Richland County, North Dakota
American people of Norwegian descent
Recipients of the Silver Star
Recipients of the Legion of Merit
Recipients of the Air Medal
United States Military Academy alumni
United States Army colonels
United States Army personnel killed in World War II